Baptized is the fourth studio album by American rock band Daughtry, released on November 19, 2013, by RCA Records. It was preceded in September by electropop-influenced lead single "Waiting for Superman". It is the final album to feature drummer Robin Diaz and first album to include keyboardist/guitarist Elvio Fernandes. The album departs significantly from the group's hard rock sound present on their first three albums, instead introducing a more pop rock musical style with strong synthpop influences.

Background
The band worked with many other songwriters and musicians on the album. Some that they worked with include Martin Johnson of Boys Like Girls, Sam Hollander, Blair Daly, Espionage, Rock Mafia, Ali Tamposi, The Monsters and the Strangerz, Scott Stevens, Kara DioGuardi, Jake Sinclair, Claude Kelly, Johnny Black, and Matthew Thiessen. Daughtry stated that he worked without his bandmates and instead went with the new producers. Daughtry has stated that the album features a new, poppier sound and would also include folk influences.

Singles
The first single from the album is "Waiting for Superman", written by Chris Daughtry, Sam Hollander, and Martin Johnson. The song was released on iTunes on September 17, 2013.

"Battleships" impacted hot adult contemporary radio on May 12, 2014 as the second official single off the album.

Other songs
"Long Live Rock & Roll" was released digitally on October 22, 2013 as the first and only promotional single off the album. It was also released as the lead single in the UK market on February 24, 2014

A new "stripped" version of "Witness" was released to digital retailers February 20, 2015.

Reception

Critical
The album has been met with mixed reviews from most critics. Chuck Eddy of Rolling Stone gave the album a 2.5 out 5, saying "Seven years after he placed on American Idol, Chris Daughtry and his band are opening up their would-be grunge to more nuance: folk instruments and synths, smoother high notes tempering Daughtry's bellow, "boom-b'boom" vocal-bass hook lightening the gender war in "Battleships." The sound on Baptized somehow links U2 to Rascal Flatts, adding Springsteen stances in "Wild Heart." More unexpectedly, there's also a banjo shuffle where Daughtry chooses Van Halen over Van Hagar, catalogs some of his other heroes and wonders who wrote Hole's songs. "Long Live Rock & Roll," it's called – a defense, perhaps, against anybody claiming guys like him helped kill it."

Glenn Gamboa of Newsday gave the album a grading of B−, saying "Daughtry takes some cool chances on his fourth album." He then commented positively on "Waiting for Superman," calling it "a sleek change of pace, rolling together bits of The Fray and Bon Jovi into the patented Daughtry sound;" and gave "Long Live Rock & Roll" a positive review, saying "he cleverly reminisces about Billy Joel and grunge in a country-style rave-up." However, he commented negatively on "Battleships" "with the stunningly weird chorus of "We love like battleships ... And the cannon goes, 'Boom boo-boom boom boo-boom boom boom,'" which is, well, crazy, and you wonder if he's gone too far." He then concluded by saying "Daughtry broadens his sound with mixed results."

Ken Capobianco of The Boston Globe also gave the album a mixed review, saying "Daughtry strips his sound to more acoustic textures and even ventures into electro-pop. At times, the change is refreshing, yet too often he seems to think the world needs more songs evoking Train or Lifehouse. Only the powder keg rocker “Traitor” diverges from the new approach. Luckily, Daughtry has one of the more expressive voices in rock, so he still breathes some life into the overload of corny lyrics."

Jon Caramanica of The New York Times delivered a more negative review for the album, saying that he felt Daughtry felt limited with the stripped-down music. "But even though Daughtry’s music has softened, there’s not much Mr. Daughtry can do with his voice, which has an appealing, powerful growl with no sultriness to it. It wants badly to roar but is given almost no opportunity."

Commercial
The album debuted at No. 6 on the Billboard 200, No. 1 on Top Internet Albums, and  No. 3 on Top Rock Albums, selling 55,000 copies in its first week. It has sold 270,000 copies in the United States as of January 2016.  In the United Kingdom, the album debuted at No. 42, selling 4,978 copies in its first week.

Track listing

Personnel

Performance credits
Background vocals – John August, Johnny Blk, Martin Johnson, Rock Mafia, Jake Sinclair
Primary artist – Daughtry (Brian Craddock, Chris Daughtry, Robin Diaz, Elvio Fernandes, Josh Paul, Josh Steely)

Instruments

Bass – Martin Johnson, Brian Paddock, Tim Pierce, Jake Sinclair
Cello – Glenn Fischbach, Jennie Lardieri
Drums – Robin Diaz, Victor Indrizzo, John Keefe, Jack Sinclair
Guitars – Chris Daughtry, Martin Johnson, Brian Paddock, Tim Pierce, Jake Sinclair
Lead guitar – Josh Steely
Rhythm guitar – Brian Craddock
Keyboard – Elvio Fernandes, Jake Sinclair
Mandolin – Tim James, Martin Johnson
Musician – Johnny Blk
Percussion – Victor Indrizzo, Martin Johnson
Piano – Elvio Fernandes, Chuck Harmony, Martin Johnson
Ukulele – Martin Johnson
Viola – Davis Barnett. Jonathan Kim
Violin – Dayna Anderson, Eliza Cho, Emma Kummrow, Olga Konopelsky, Luigi Mazzocchi, Charles Parker

Production

A&R – Rani Hancock
Arrangement:
String arrangements – Larry Gold
Assistant – Karl Peterson
Coordination:
Production coordination – Christopher Hunte, Kayla Lee
Editing:
Digital editing – John August, Chris Bernard
Drum technician – Chris Bernard, Gersh
Engineer – busbee, Adam Comstock, Elivo Fernandes, Steve Hammons, Martin Johnson, Kyle Moorman, Brian Paddock, Mike Piazza, Steve Shebby, SmH, Speed Ninja
Assistant engineer – Marcus Johnson
Mixing engineer – John Hanes
String engineer – Jeff Chestak
Instrumentation – Martin Johnson
Mastering – Chris Gehringer
Mixing – Serban Ghenea
Producer – Chris Daughtry, Martin Johnson, Johnny Blk, busbee, DreZa, Elivo Fernandes, Toby Gad, Onree Gill, Martin Johnson, Claude Kelly, MDL, Rock Mafia, Jake Sinclair
Programming – Martin Johnson, Kyle Moorman, Brian Paddock, Steve Shebby, Jake Sinclair
Additional production – Johnny Blk, Aaron Dudley, Kyle Moorman, Brian Paddock, David Schuler
String conduction – Larry Gold

Imagery
Art direction – Chris Feldmann, Michelle Holme
Band photo – Michael Muller
Creative director – Erwin Gorostiza
Design – Alice Butts
Photography – José Enrique Montes Hernandez, Jasper James

Charts and sales

Weekly charts

Year-end charts

Sales

Release history

Notes

References

2013 albums
Daughtry (band) albums
RCA Records albums
19 Recordings albums